Najlepši par is the fifth studio album by Serbian singer Dragana Mirković and the third to feature the band Južni Vetar. It was released in 1988.

This is Dragana's third album with Južni Vetar. They went on to record a total of five albums together, one was released each year beginning in 1986.

Track listing

References

1988 albums
Dragana Mirković albums